Izumi Tateno (Tateno Izumi, (born 10 November 1936 in Tokyo) is a Japanese pianist.

Tateno studied at the Tōkyō Geijutsu Daigaku and is today a professor at the Sibelius Academy in Helsinki.

After a stroke during a concert on 9 January 2002, he had to take a break for some time. Even after medical rehabilitation, he still had paralysis of the right side of his body; since his comeback in May 2004, he has therefore played exclusively with his left hand. Numerous composers dedicated pieces to him specially tailored to his requirements. Tateno has won many prizes and awards. Since 17 September 1990, he has been chairman of the Japanese Sibelius Society (日本シベリウス協会, Nihon Shiberiusu Kyōkai), of which he is a founding member.

Tateno is currently active mainly in Finland. In Japan, he has become widely known through the theme tune he performed for the television drama Taira no Kiyomori, composed by Takashi Yoshimatsu.

References

External links 
 
 

1936 births
Academic staff of Sibelius Academy
Classical pianists who played with one arm
Japanese classical pianists
Japanese male classical pianists
Keio University alumni
Living people
People from Meguro
Tokyo University of the Arts alumni
20th-century Japanese musicians
20th-century Japanese male musicians
20th-century classical pianists
21st-century Japanese musicians
21st-century Japanese male musicians
21st-century classical pianists
Musicians from Tokyo